Mallapur is a mandal in the Jagtial district of the Indian state of Telangana.

Demographics 
 census, Mallapur mndal had 53,870 inhabitants, with 26,080 males and 27,790 females.

References 

Villages in Jagtial district